African Wanderers is a South African professional football club, based in the Chatsworth township, which is a suburb of Durban in South Africa. The club currently play in the KwaZulu-Natal province of Vodacom League, and prefer to use the SJ Smith Stadium as home venue.

External links
SAFA Official Website -database with results of Vodacom League

References

Association football clubs established in 1906
SAFA Second Division clubs
Soccer clubs in KwaZulu-Natal
Soccer clubs in Durban
1906 establishments in the Colony of Natal
1906 establishments in South Africa